Ifigenia (in English Iphigenia: Diary of a Young Girl Who Wrote Because She Was Bored) is a 1924 Venezuelan novel by Teresa de la Parra. Ifigenia marked a change in Latin American literature. The novel is a feminist critique of Caracan society in the early twentieth century. Strict moral rules are represented by the grandmother in this novel, and the character of Uncle Pancho represents the ambitious personality which was common at the time due to political corruption. Besides being a harsh criticism of society, Ifigenia is a fast-paced work with detailed descriptions. The novel caused serious problems for the author because the Venezuelan dictator Juan Vicente Gómez denied her a grant to publish the book. De la Parra decided to move to Paris. A veiled criticism of the regime of Gomez can be seen in Ifigenia.

Adaptions
A television version of this novel scripted by Salvador Garmendia, starring :es:Amanda Gutiérrez and Leopoldo Regnault, premiered in 1979 on Venezolana de Television, a Venezuelan television network. Meanwhile, Venezuelan filmmaker  filmed an eponymous movie in 1986. In 2008, the channel RCTV prepared and transmitted a new version by writer Martin Hahn, starring Marianela Gonzalez and Hugo Vasquez.

References

External links 
 Ensayo sobre Ifigenia en Analítica
 "Mujer y espacio urbano en Ifigenia"  Ensayo de Elena González-Muntaner en La ciudad en la literatura y el cine: Aspectos de la representación de la ciudad en la producción literaria y cinematográfica en español. Eds. Santiago Juan-Navarro y Joan Torres-Pou. Barcelona: Promociones y Publicaciones Universitarias, 2009.

Novels by Teresa de la Parra
1924 novels
Venezuelan novels adapted into films
Novels adapted into television shows